Milton Transit is the public transit system in the town of Milton, Ontario, Canada.  Milton is in Halton Regional Municipality, part of the Greater Toronto Area.

Milton Transit began its present service on August 16, 2004 and expanded from 3 fixed routes to 5 fixed routes on September 5, 2005. It  replaced the former dial-a-bus and GO Transit local connector, which used school buses.  The fixed route service was operated in partnership with Oakville Transit, which, however, never provided services connecting the municipalities.

Oakville Transit also originally stored and maintained the buses at their garage. Buses were later stored and serviced at the Mississauga Truck and Bus Collision (MTB) facility, in Milton. That eliminated unnecessary travel to/from Oakville, as the buses previously had been deadheaded to and from Oakville each day. Prior to the agreement with MTB, Milton's buses were stored at GO Transit's Milton garage. The Town of Milton extended the contract for conventional transit services with Oakville Transit for a further three years, effective March 1, 2008.

In early 2010, the Town of Milton announced that it would be ending its agreements with Oakville Transit and Mississauga Truck and Bus, and that Pacific Western Transportation would be taking over all aspects of service beginning March 8, 2010.

Since the inauguration of the service, there have been major adjustments in order to connect with the growing population of this town, and to the Milton line commuter train and bus routes operated by GO Transit.

Routes

Regular

Drop-off service 

As the last train from Union Station along the Milton line arrives at the Milton GO Station, drivers will create a routing based on passengers' destinations within the designated zone.

Community Bus 

Milton Transit also provides community buses for people with seniors as well as those with mobility issues.

Trans-cab 
Trans-cab is a supplementary service that replaces Route 1 between the Milton GO Station and the Milton Hwy 401 Park and Ride facility at Martin Street. Fares are the same as regular Milton Transit Fares, plus an additional 50 cents.

Connecting transit 
Milton Transit connects with the following transit agencies:

 Brampton Transit
 GO Transit
 MiWay (Mississauga Transit)

Access+ 
First Canada and A1 Taxi had the contract for accessible services which operate on demand until sometime in 2015. Pacific Western Transportation which also holds the contract for conventional service took over operations of Access+ using a Milton branded bus.

Roster

Milton Transit's fleet consists of 10 New Flyer D40LF - three purchased in 2009, two in 2010 and 5 used ones (ex-Orange County Transportation Authority and later Pacific Western) in 2014 and 2015, 3 New Flyer XD40's (purchased in 2012) and 3 Chevrolet Arboc SOM26D's in 2013 and two more in 2015, two 2016 Nova Bus LFS for service expansion along with three 2017 and one 2018 Nova Bus LFS. For a detailed fleet summary, see Milton Transit on the CPTDB Wiki.

Terminals
 Milton GO Station

See also

 Public transport in Canada

References

External links
 Official website

Transport in Milton, Ontario
Transit agencies in Ontario
Transport in the Regional Municipality of Halton